The Gardeners of America/Men's Garden Clubs of America (TGOA/MGCA) is a national organization with 31 affiliated garden clubs located in 14 states (2018) across the United States. The organization is also known as Gardeners of America (TGOA) or Men’s Garden Clubs of America (MGCA). It has its headquarters in Johnston, Iowa, a  business suburb of Des Moines.  It is a non-profit organization incorporated in the state of Illinois, and registered with the IRS as a 501(c)3 non-profit group.  Most clubs include men and women members, and concentrate on gardening education (for members and nonmembers), and community beautification and enhancement.  At one time the organization had about 10,000 members.

History 
The Men's Garden Clubs of America organization was founded in 1932, and grew rapidly as a unique organization of male gardeners.  By 1993 the organization had grown greatly, and the bylaws were changed.  The organization became The Gardeners of America with two divisions: The Gardeners of America and Men’s Garden Clubs of America.  While local clubs may feel more closely affiliated with one division, all are members of TGOA/MGCA. Today many clubs include both men and women, although some all-male clubs still exist.

Objective 
The mission statement of TGOA/MGCA as stated on the organization website is

The mission of TGOA/MGCA is to promote gardening education and related environmental issues to its membership and the gardening public through charitable, educational and scientific means.

It works towards this objective by providing activities that help member clubs develop and publicize new or improved gardening techniques. People living in a location without local garden clubs can become a member-at-large and participate in TGOA/MGCA programs.  TGOA/MGCA operates in partnership with the American Horticultural Society, and optional membership in AHS includes the publication  The American Gardener, which cites TGOA/MGCA activities.

TGOA/MGCA is listed as a gardening resource on various websites.

National programs 
In addition to the programs and projects of local garden clubs, TGOA/MGCA sponsors the following national programs.

 Gardening From The Heart provides community services for projects that benefit disadvantaged and aging gardeners.
 Big Pumpkin, Giant Sunflower, and Container Garden Contests encourages kids to grow plants.
 Youth Gardening provides national funding for gardening projects that engage youth.
 Scholarships of $1,000 are awarded annually to horticulture students based on local club applications.
 Photography Contest rewards members by publishing their photographs in the Gardener's Calendar, and by displaying them on the Internet.  They are shown during  presentations at each year’s national convention.
 Gardener's Calendar is published annually using photographs from the Photography Contest.  Many clubs use the calendar for fundraising, or present it as a speaker gift or other award.
 Website www.TGOA-MGCA.org provides up-to-date information for members and officers.  Although there is a members-only section of the website, much useful information about gardening and club activities is available to the general public as part of the organization's education mission.  For example, Gardening and Horticulture Publications is a wide-ranging collection of articles that are posted online, and available to anyone.

Botanist Liberty Hyde Bailey was awarded the first Johnny Appleseed Memorial Medal by Men's Garden Clubs of America in 1948.

Local clubs 
Affiliated clubs are located across the United States, with most located in mid-America. Specific details about each club (such as club name, location, and contact information) are available at the TGOA/MGCA website.  Many garden club websites specifically cite their club's current or past affiliation with TGOA/MGCA.

Sometimes affiliation with TGOA/MGCA leads to the formation of a more narrowly focused garden club, as is the case with the Corvallis Rose Society.

Accomplishments 
Club members engage in a wide range of activities.  The table that follows shows conservative estimates of total annual contributions made by all TGOA/MGCA clubs to their communities.  This information is based on a 2007 survey where 45% of member clubs responded.

Meetings and conventions 
There are several occasions when members gather into groups on a regular basis: local club meetings, regional meetings, national planning and business meetings, and national conventions.

Local meetings 
Arrangements for local club meetings vary based on the needs of individual clubs and their communities, but they generally are held monthly, and include an educational program on gardening techniques, community enhancement, or other topics. They also review current and future club projects and present awards to club members,  Time is included for sharing gardening or project problems and solutions, and socializing.

Regional meetings 
The 36 clubs in 14 states are grouped into 11 geographic regions (2016), as shown in the following table.  If a state has more than one club, then that number is shown in parenthesis after the state name.  Missouri has clubs in two regions.

Each region is formally chartered by the national organization, adopts its own bylaws using the TGOA/MGCA bylaws as a guide, and assists in carrying out national programs.  Each club elects a National Director to the TGOA/MGCA board, to represent the club at board and region meetings and to provide direct club communications with the National office and officers.

Other activities that take place by region include gardening workshops and seminars, tours of local gardens, business meetings, annual regional conferences, and the presentation of region awards to club members.

Board meetings 
The board of directors meets at each national convention, and also holds an annual meeting in November of each year.

National conventions 
TGOA/MGCA holds annual national conventions that are hosted by local clubs in cities across the United States.  The purpose of each convention is to learn from other gardeners, tour local gardens and horticultural sites, participate in educational workshops and seminars, share information on service projects and fundraisers, present national awards to club members, and conduct a business meeting of the organization.

Notes 
All links are to pages on the TGOA/MGCA website that contain information not presented in this article.

References 

Community gardening in the United States
Horticultural organizations based in the United States
Clubs and societies in the United States
Non-profit organizations based in Iowa
1932 establishments in the United States
Johnston, Iowa